Black billionaires are individuals who are of predominantly African ancestry with a net worth of at least US$1 billion.

According to the 2021 Forbes ranking of the world's billionaires, Nigerian business magnate Aliko Dangote had a net worth of $11.5 billion and was the world's richest black man.

Other billionaires of African descent on the 2021 Forbes list included Nigerian businessman Mike Adenuga with $6.1 billion, American investor Robert Smith with $6 billion, American businessman David Steward with $3.7 billion, American media mogul Oprah Winfrey with $2.7 billion, South African gold magnate Patrice Motsepe with $2.9 billion, Byaruhanga Kimberly Junior Southern African mining magnate, entrepreneur and investor with $2.8 billion, Tiger Woods, Barbadian music artist/entrepreneur Rihanna with $1.7 billion, American sports executive Michael Jordan with $1.6 billion, Jamaican-Canadian businessman Michael Lee-Chin with $1.6 billion, Nigerian businessman Abdul Samad Rabiu with $1.6 billion, American rapper Jay-Z with $1.4 billion, Nigerian businesswoman Folorunsho Alakija with $1.1 billion, Mo Ibrahim of the United Kingdom with $1.1 billion, and American media mogul Tyler Perry with $1 billion.

From 2001 to 2003, Forbes listed American television network executive Bob Johnson as a billionaire, but dropped him after his fortune was split in his divorce. He returned to the Forbes Billionaire list in 2007 with a net worth of $1.1 billion. In 2008 Johnson's wealth dropped again, this time to approximately $1.0 billion, and by 2009 he fell off the list again. Nigerian petroleum executive Femi Otedola briefly emerged as a billionaire in 2009 but did not remain one in subsequent years. He returned to the list in the company of a fellow Nigerian, sugar tycoon Abdul Samad Rabiu, in 2016, but both were dropped from the rankings the following year.

Multiracial billionaires with significant African ancestry have been identified over the years. Saudi Arabian billionaire Mohammed Al Amoudi, of Hadhrami Yemeni and Ethiopian descent, has been on the Forbes billionaire list since 2002 and in 2012 had a net worth of $12.5 billion. Michael Lee-Chin of Canada, who is Jamaican of Chinese and Black ancestry, was on the list from 2001 to 2010 but dropped off in 2011. Isabel dos Santos is of both Angolan and Russian ancestry. Alex Karp, co-founder, and CEO of Palantir Technologies, has an African-American mother. Rihanna is of both Guyanese and Irish descent.

Of all the above-mentioned billionaires identified by Forbes, only Oprah Winfrey qualified for Forbes 2009's list of the world's 20 most powerful billionaires, a list which considered not only wealth, but also market sway and political clout. Winfrey was considered especially powerful because of her influence on American consumer choices and her pivotal role in Barack Obama's successful 2008 U.S. presidential campaign.

List of Black billionaires
(Wealth valuations by Forbes magazine)

References

Lists of people by wealth
Demographic economics
Billionaires
Lists of black people